Ammonium hexafluorophosphate is the inorganic compound with the formula NH4PF6. It is a white water-soluble, hygroscopic solid. The compound is a salt consisting of the ammonium cation and hexafluorophosphate anion. It is commonly used as a source of the hexafluorophosphate anion, a weakly coordinating anion. It is prepared by combining neat ammonium fluoride and phosphorus pentachloride. Alternatively it can also be produced from phosphonitrilic chloride:
PCl5 + 6 NH4F → NH4PF6 + 5 NH4Cl

PNCl2 + 6 HF → NH4PF6 + 2 HCl

References

Ammonium compounds
Hexafluorophosphates